Marcell Allmond (born May 28, 1981) is an American football cornerback.

High school career
Allmond played high school football at St. Paul High in Santa Fe Springs, California, where he also ran on the track and field team, along with brother Tony.  He was the CIF California State Meet champion in the 110 metres hurdles both in 1998 and 1999.  In 1999, he added a 6th place in the 300 hurdles, while his brother got 4th in the long jump, combining for the school's best showing at the meet.

Later in the year, he finished second, less than 100 points behind future Olympic Gold Medalist Bryan Clay in the decathlon at the 1999 Pan American Junior Athletics Championships.

College career
Allmond played college football at the University of Southern California and was part of their 2003 national championship team.  He was a three-year starter at cornerback and wide receiver.

Professional career
Allmond was on the Baltimore Ravens practice squad in 2004. He played for the Jacksonville Jaguars in 2005.

References

External links
 CBS Sportsline page

1981 births
American football cornerbacks
Living people
USC Trojans football players
Players of American football from Anaheim, California